Monte Cairo (1,669 m) is a mountain in Lazio (in the province of Frosinone), overshadowing both the Abbey and the town of Monte Cassino, 5 kilometres to the south.

Features 
The ancient 'Mons Clarius' was so called because originally a temple dedicated to Apollo (Clarius) stood where the Abbey of Monte Cassino now stands. The Monte Cairo is the main peak of an isolated mountain range that extends eastwards for about 16–18 km from the Alta Valle del Melfa, the road from Rome to Naples.

The geological structure is of limestone dating from the Cretaceous period and the formation often experiences violent earthquakes and subsidence. The tops of the mountains are barren, in contrast to the partially wooded sides. At an altitude of 1300 m and west of Monte Cairo lies the Monte Pozzacone Refuge, a property owned by the town of Colle San Magno and a suitable base for climbing to the top of Monte Cairo. Other peaks of the group include the Monte Obachelle (1476 metres) where there is a significant Karstic sinkhole, the Pizzo di Prato Caselle (1372 metres), and the Cimmaron Villaneto (1315 m).

Ascension 
The top of the mountain is a 4-hour hike along a path through beech groves and across a plateau of snow.
The vista from the top includes Appennino Marsicano (Monti Marsicani), the Mainarde, the Monti della Meta, the Matese, the sea up to Gaeta, the Pontine Islands, Mount Vesuvius and the Abbey of Montecassino.

References 

Hills of Italy
Mountains of Italy